SBS independent (SBSi) operated as the commissioning house for Australia's multicultural public broadcaster, the Special Broadcasting Service (SBS), between August 1994 and December 2007. It was instituted via the landmark "Creative Nation" cultural policy initiative released in October 1994 by the Keating Government. The core purpose of the institution was to commission multicultural content from Australian independent film and television producers. At the end of December 2007, SBSi ceased to function as an administratively independent institution, and was merged with the SBS Content and Online Division.

For the thirteen years that it operated, SBSi commissioned more than 810 titles spanning feature film, animation, television drama, documentary, comedy, variety and reality programs, totalling over 1500 hours of content. This content was often commissioned from inexperienced and early career television and filmmakers, many of whom come from non-English speaking and Indigenous backgrounds. SBSi titles have attracted significant critical acclaim internationally, winning in excess of 450 awards, including a 2003 Academy Award for Adam Elliott's animated short film, Harvie Krumpet.

SBSi was a significant cultural institution that reshaped production and representational practices in the Australian film and television sectors. Most significantly, through collaborative partnerships with other federal and state film financing organisations, SBSi helped to nurture a new generation of Indigenous filmmakers including Ivan Sen, Warwick Thornton and Rachel Perkins.
Its commissioned works have been widely recognised through film and television awards and acknowledged by broader community response throughout Australia and overseas.

SBSi commissioned feature films, drama series, animation, single documentaries, and documentary series.

Productions

A comprehensive list of SBS Independent productions can be found at the SBS Independent Commissioned Content Database. The titles listed below is a small sample of the more popular programs that gained distribution beyond their initial television exhibition.

Animation 
Animated Tales of the World
Bobtales
Harvie Krumpet
John Callahan's Quads!
Leunig
The Mysterious Geographic Explorations of Jasper Morello

Comedy 
Wilfred
Pizza (TV series)

Documentary 
The Prodigal Son
Australia By Numbers series
Fond Memories of Cuba
Golden Sandals: The Art of Reg Mombassa
John Safran's Music Jamboree
John Safran vs God
Nerds F.C.
Poles Apart
Sydney 2000
The Animated Leunig
Decadence
Bush School

Films

See also
Special Broadcasting Service

References

Television production companies of Australia
Special Broadcasting Service